Danny Louis Bradley (born March 2, 1963) is a former American football running back. He played professionally in the National Football League (NFL)

College career
Bradley played quarterback for the Oklahoma Sooners from 1981 to 1984. He was the Big Eight Offensive Player of the Year and MVP in 1984.

Professional career
Bradley was drafted by the Los Angeles Rams in the 1985 NFL draft.  He played for the Detroit Lions for three games in 1987. He became the first African-American front office executive with the Dallas Cowboys at the age of 32.

Education and family
Bradley earned a bachelor's degree in political science in 1988 from the University of Oklahoma.

Bradley is also the father of NFL wide receiver Mark Bradley formerly of the Chicago Bears, Kansas City Chiefs, and Tampa Bay Buccaneers.  Mark also attended the University of Oklahoma. The two recently authored a biography titled ("1nsepara6le") Faith-Family-Fatherhood.

References

1963 births
Living people
American football quarterbacks
American football running backs
Detroit Lions players
Oklahoma Sooners football players
Sportspeople from Pine Bluff, Arkansas
Players of American football from Arkansas
National Football League replacement players